Girolamo Negri, also known as il Boccia (circa 1648 - after 1718) was an Italian painter of the Baroque period.

Biography
Negri was born at Bologna. He initially trained with Domenico Maria Canuti, but then entered the studio of Lorenzo Pasinelli. He also painted in Modena, Mirandola, Faenza and Cesena. He painted an Apparition of the Virgin and Child to St Peter for the Bologna Cathedral. He painted the Denial by St Peter for the church of San Filippo Neri, Bologna.

References

1648 births
Year of death unknown
17th-century Italian painters
18th-century Italian painters
Italian male painters
Painters from Bologna
Italian Baroque painters
18th-century Italian male artists